Joseph Helffrich (12 January 1890 in Mannheim, Baden – 1971) was a German astronomer.

He did his Ph.D. dissertation in 1913 at the Landessternwarte Heidelberg-Königstuhl (Königstuhl Observatory, near Heidelberg) at the University of Heidelberg .

At the time, the observatory at Heidelberg was a center for asteroid discovery under the direction of Max Wolf, and during his time there Helffrich discovered a number of asteroids.

References 
 

 Helffrich, Joseph: Untersuchungen im Sternhaufen h Persei nach Aufnahmen mit dem Waltz-Reflektor der Heidelberger Sternwarte. Braun, Mannheim 1913, 23 S. (Heidelberg, Naturwiss.-math. Diss. v. 17. Nov. 1913)
 Schmadel, Lutz D.: Dictionary of Minor Planet Names. 5th ed. Springer, Berlin 2003,

External links 
 Asteroid 2290 Helffrich
 List of Dissertations at the Landessternwarte Heidelberg-Königstuhl

20th-century German astronomers
Discoverers of asteroids
1890 births
1971 deaths